The 2017–18 Irani Cup was the 56th season of Irani Cup, a first-class cricket competition in India. It was played as a one-off match between Vidarbha (the winner of the 2017–18 Ranji trophy) and Rest of India cricket team. The match was played from 14 March 2018 to 18 March 2018 at the Vidarbha Cricket Association Stadium, Nagpur.

Squads

Ravindra Jadeja was ruled out of Rest of India's squad before the start of the tournament. He was replaced by Ravichandran Ashwin

Match

References

External links
 Series home at ESPNCricinfo

First-class cricket matches
2018 in Indian cricket
Irani Cup
Irani Cup
Irani Cup